Tin City is a specialty shopping district in Naples, Florida. It is open-air, specializing in antiques and local handmade novelties.

There are four separate buildings. You can buy food, antiques, clothes, seashells, candles, wine, mood rings, and much more.

You can go through one section, end up outside, and then enter another building.

External links
 Tin City official website

Shopping districts and streets in the United States
Shopping malls established in 1976
Buildings and structures in Naples, Florida
Tourist attractions in Collier County, Florida